The Central District of Dasht-e Azadegan County is a district (bakhsh) in Dasht-e Azadegan County, Khuzestan Province, Iran. At the 2006 census, its population was 86,519, in 15,029 families.  The district has three cities: Susangerd, Abu Homeyzeh & Kut-e Seyyed Naim.  The district has three rural districts (dehestan): Allah-o Akbar Rural District, Howmeh-ye Gharbi Rural District and Howmeh-ye Sharqi Rural District.

References 

Dasht-e Azadegan County
Districts of Khuzestan Province